Ibrillos is a municipality located in the province of Burgos, Castile and León, Spain. According to the 2005 census (INE), the municipality has a population of 101 inhabitants.

References 

Municipalities in the Province of Burgos